The Bonaire Democratic Party (PDB), also known as Demokrat, is a political party in Bonaire and formerly the Netherlands Antilles.

History 
The party was founded in 1954 by Julio Antonio Abraham. It is a progressive social-democratic party that advocates for more autonomy for the island of Bonaire.

In the 2002 Netherlands Antilles general election, the party won 2.6% of the popular vote and 1 out of 22 seats in the Estates. In the 2006 general election, the party kept 1 seat, winning 44.5% of the vote in Bonaire. In the 2015 island council election, the party won 3 out of 9 seats and formed a coalition with the Bonaire Patriotic Union (UPB).

In the 2019 election, the party won 3 seats in the Island Council

References

Political parties in Bonaire
Social democratic parties in North America
Social democratic parties in the Netherlands